A total lunar eclipse will take place on January 1, 2048. It will be the first recorded lunar eclipse to be visible on New Year's Day for nearly all of Earth's timezones. The next such eclipse will occur in 2094.

Visibility

Related lunar eclipses

Lunar year series

Half-Saros cycle
A lunar eclipse will be preceded and followed by solar eclipses by 9 years and 5.5 days (a half saros). This lunar eclipse is related to two total solar eclipses of Solar Saros 142.

Tzolkinex 
 Preceded: Lunar eclipse of November 18, 2040

 Followed: Lunar eclipse of February 11, 2055

See also
List of lunar eclipses and List of 21st-century lunar eclipses

References

External links

2048-01
2048-01
2048 in science